Stefan Edberg was the defending champion.

Edberg successfully defended his title, defeating Jonas Svensson 7–5, 6–2, 4–6, 6–4 in the final.

Seeds

  Stefan Edberg (champion)
  Mats Wilander (second round)
  Joakim Nyström (third round)
  Emilio Sánchez (second round)
  Anders Järryd (semifinals)
  Mikael Pernfors (second round)
  Jonas Svensson (final)
  Peter Lundgren (quarterfinals)
  Kelly Evernden (second round)
  Jimmy Arias (third round)
  Jan Gunnarsson (second round)
  Jim Pugh (first round)
  Paolo Canè (second round)
  Tim Wilkison (first round)
  Sergio Casal (third round)
  Ulf Stenlund (third round)

Draw

Finals

Top half

Section 1

Section 2

Bottom half

Section 3

Section 4

References

 Main Draw

Stockholm Open
1987 Grand Prix (tennis)